Hasht Bandi (also Romanized as Hasht Bandī) is a city and capital of Tukahur District, in Minab County, Hormozgan Province, Iran. At the 2006 census, its population was 50731, in 13345families.

References

Populated places in Minab County
Cities in Hormozgan Province